Esteban Casagolda Collazo (born 5 January 1987) is a Belgian football striker who currently plays for Lokeren-Temse in the Belgian Division 2.

Club career
The striker has spent most of his career in Belgium, with FC Brussels, Diegem Sport, Racing Mechelen and Union Saint Gilloise. He was offered a trial at Stockport County. He was then offered a trial with Motherwell and, after impressing the Fir Park club, he was subsequently awarded a one-year deal. He then made his debut in a 3–2 defeat to Hibernian. He signed then on 22 July 2012 a one-year contract with Belgian lower league side Union St. Gilloise.

Personal life
Casagolda was born in Belgium to a Spanish father and a Uruguayan mother.

References

External links

1987 births
Living people
Association football forwards
Belgian footballers
Belgian people of Spanish descent
Belgian people of Uruguayan descent
Belgian expatriate footballers
Belgian expatriate sportspeople in Scotland
Expatriate footballers in Scotland
R.W.D.M. Brussels F.C. players
Motherwell F.C. players
Scottish Premier League players
Belgian Pro League players
Challenger Pro League players
Royale Union Saint-Gilloise players
K.R.C. Mechelen players
F.C.V. Dender E.H. players
Oud-Heverlee Leuven players
K.S.V. Roeselare players
K. Diegem Sport players